Dichondra repens is a small, prostrate, herbaceous plant native to New Zealand and many parts of Australia. It is occasionally known as kidney weed in Australia and as Mercury Bay weed in New Zealand. Most commonly called dichondra in Australia.

The plant often occurs in forest, woodland, and grassland habitat types. It can also be found in lawns, where it may be deliberately planted or come up as a weed. In California as well as parts of China it has escaped gardens and naturalised in some habitats.

Taxonomy
Dichondra repens was originally described by German naturalists Johann Reinhold Forster and Georg Forster, its specific epithet the Latin adjective repens, meaning "creeping". The lectotype was collected by them in New Zealand and is in the Forster collection at Göttingen. In Convolvulaceae, the Morning Glory Family.

Description
The plant is a perennial herb that has a creeping habit, with roots forming at the nodes. The leaves are kidney-shaped to circular and measure 0.5 to 2.5 cm (0.2–1 in) long. The base of the leaf is heart-shaped (cordate) and its apex emarginated or rounded. The upper and undersurface of the leaf are covered in fine hair. The tiny yellowish-green flowers can appear at any time of the year, more profusely from September to February and most so in November. The fruit is a hairy, two-lobed capsule.

Distribution and habitat
Dichondra repens occurs in South Africa. It is found in all mainland Australian states and Tasmania. Within New South Wales it is widespread across eastern and central parts of the state.

It grows on clay or clay-based soils that are medium to high in nutrients in flat places in forested areas. Associated species in New South Wales are river peppermint (Eucalyptus elata), thin-leaved stringybark (E. eugenioides), woollybutt (E. longifolia) and snow-in-summer (Melaleuca linariifolia).

Ecology
The native Pacific black duck (Anas superciliosa) eats the seeds.

Cultivation
This species is cultivated as an ornamental plant, and can be used as a lawn substitute or groundcover in gardens. It comes in shades of green through to grey.

References

External links
 New Zealand Plant Conservation Network: Dichondra repens.

Convolvulaceae
Flora of New South Wales
Flora of Queensland
Flora of South Australia
Flora of Tasmania
Flora of Victoria (Australia)
Flora of Western Australia
Flora of New Zealand
Garden plants of Australia
Groundcovers